Dioptis phelina is a moth of the family Notodontidae first described by Cajetan and Rudolf Felder in 1874. It is endemic to the region of Bogota in Colombia.

References

Moths described in 1874
Notodontidae